Harrison High School (HHS) is a public high school located in Harrison, Westchester County, New York, United States. It is the only high school operated by the Harrison Central School District.

Academics
In 2016, Harrison ranked 211 in the nation and 13 in the state in rigor according to The Washington Post'''s America's Most Challenging High Schools index.

In 2019, Harrison ranked #328 nationally in the U.S. News & World Report'' Best High Schools Rankings.

Demographics
The demographic breakdown of the 1,087 students enrolled in 2016–17 was:
Male – 51.2%
Female – 48.8%
Native American/Alaskan – 1.0%
Asian/Pacific islanders – 10%
Black – 2.3%
Hispanic – 20.2%
White – 70%
Multiracial – 1.1%
Built Different - 100%
Rahul Goodypotty - -1%

23.4% of the students were eligible for free or reduced lunch.

Athletics
Harrison High teams are named "Huskies." Their colors are maroon and white. One of the oldest traditions is the Harrison Rye Game, a football game between the Harrison Huskies, and the Garnets, the football team from Rye High School, in the neighboring town of Rye, NY.

Building

The current building of the Harrison High School was built in 1973 and 1974, and opened for September 1974. The building was built as a solution to the lack in size of the Harrison Junior Senior High School, serving grades 6 to 12, established in 1957 in the building built to be the Harrison High School in 1939. The building is currently used as the middle school. Harrison High School demonstrates a circular design, like a rotunda, with a hallway spanning one quarter of a circle, and a hallway that is a full circle radially centered inside the primary hallway, connected by two other hallways, the Main Hallway, and the Senior Hallway. The building is two stories tall and has two gyms, a cafeteria, a theater, and 213 classrooms.

The building is home to the Harrison Performing Arts Center, renovated in 2007, by a $1,250,000 grant received from the New York State Education Department in collaboration with the Harrison Educational Foundation (HEF). The Harrison Performing Arts Center (HPAC) features 825 seats, two balconies, a separate Light Booth, an extra high stage bow as well as state-of-the-art lighting systems by Electronic Theatre Controls and audio systems by Allen and Heath. The high school performing arts facility in New York State, the HPAC, is entirely managed by students. The Harrison Technical Crew has been recognized by the Helen Hays Youth Theatre Foundation for Outstanding Achievement in Musicals and Drama. The HPAC and Sirius Black Box Theatre are under the supervision of the Director of Fine and Performing Arts, Ms. Mary Ellis.

The building was originally home to a then-state-of-the-art planetarium complete with 25 ft. diameter dome, and a projector that could recede into a tunnel when not used, as well as built in theater-style seating and offset lighting. Unfortunately, due to the building lacking space, when a dance studio was needed for the school to be able to apply for the International Baccalaureate (IB) program, the planetarium was the space that was decided to be renovated. It is now a dance studio/planetarium, with a movable star projector, mirrors mounted on the walls, a wooden floor and folding seating. In addition to being a dance studio, it is also a black-box theater, named the Sirius Black Box Theater, the word 'Sirius' pertaining to the star, Sirius, because it is a planetarium.

References

External links
 

Public high schools in Westchester County, New York
Harrison, New York